Andrea Petkovic was the defending champion going into the competition, but couldn't defend her title as she was still competing at the French Open.

Alexandra Dulgheru won the title, defeating Johanna Larsson in the final, 6–3, 7–5.

Seeds

Main draw

Finals

Top half

Bottom half

References 
 Main draw

Open Feminin De Marseille - Singles